α-Aminobutyric acid (AABA), also known as homoalanine in biochemistry, is a non-proteinogenic alpha amino acid with chemical formula C4H9NO2. The straight two carbon side chain is one carbon longer than alanine, hence the prefix homo-.

Homoalanine is biosynthesised by transaminating oxobutyrate, a metabolite in isoleucine biosynthesis. It is used by nonribosomal peptide synthases. One example of a nonribosomal peptide containing homoalanine is ophthalmic acid, which was first isolated from calf lens.

α-Aminobutyric acid is one of the three isomers of aminobutyric acid. The two other are the neurotransmitter γ-Aminobutyric acid (GABA) and β-Aminobutyric acid (BABA) which is known for inducing plant disease resistance.

The conjugate base of α-aminobutyric acid is the carboxylate α-aminobutyrate.

References

Amino acids
GABA analogues